The Church of Santo Domingo is a Catholic church in the historic center of the city of Quito, capital of Ecuador. The complex of convent, church and chapels is located on the Plaza de Santo Domingo, itself named after the church.

History
Its construction began in 1540, when the site was assigned to the community of Dominican fathers; Later, and after a provisional chapel was built, the definitive plans of the temple that persist to the present day were drawn up in 1581 by the architect Francisco Becerra. After Becerra's death, the work passed into the hands of Father Rodrigo Manrique de Lara; Friar Antonio Rodríguez was in charge of the works of the convent, while Friar Juan Mantilla was in charge of completing the works of the church in 1688.

Architecture
The church is covered in cedar work covered with gold leaf, and numerous paintings and carvings adorn its interior. Along with the main altarpiece, the ten side chapels that complete the interior complex of Santo Domingo further enrich the internal body of the church with beautiful woodwork and gold leaf.

Undoubtedly, the Chapel of the Virgen del Rosario is the best known of the complex; However, it is not the only one that shows the cultural interest of the temple, as Pazos Barrera indicates: "in another chapel, the mural painting of the Virgin of the Staircase, the work of Father Pedro Bedón and dating from the early years of the 17th century, is preserved.".

The Cloister, for its part, has corridors and bays with double arches with octagonal pillars, and is due to brother Antonio Rodríguez, who built it based on the design of Francisco Becerra.

Arch of Santo Domingo

As in other churches and civil constructions in the city of Quito, the builders of Santo Domingo found themselves from the beginning with an abrupt and uneven terrain, for which they had to invent various architectural solutions to give continuity to the main temple and especially to the chapels; from there was born the famous Arch of Santo Domingo, on which is the Chapel of the Virgen del Rosario, and through whose base runs, without interruption, calle Rocafuerte. The Arch of Santo Domingo was built in 1732.

Square
The Plaza de Santo Domingo is in front of the Church. In the center stands a monument to Marshal Antonio José de Sucre, Venezuelan hero of the Independence. Around the Plaza, in addition to the Church and the convent, there are important civil buildings, such as the old Colonial University of Santo Tomás de Aquino and the mansion of former president Gabriel García Moreno. The Plaza has an area of ​​approximately 7,200 square meters, with sides measuring approximately 85 meters in linear meters. Like the other squares in the city, it was originally a simple esplanade, and was later converted into a park and a bus station. Today it is an esplanade paved with stone.

Chapel of la Virgen del Rosario
The richest and most well-known of the chapels of the church of Santo Domingo is the Chapel del Rosario, which is located towards the south side of the transept, and which is built on three different levels. This chapel overlooks the old street of La Loma (today called Rocafuerte), where to solve another unevenness in the land, the architects built the Arch of Santo Domingo, with cone-shaped buttresses that evoke lookout posts.

The three levels of the chapel respond to a kind of stratification: the lowest was intended for the common citizen, the second for the priest and the authorities, and the third for the Virgin of the Rosary. Since 1650, three confraternities worked in this chapel; the first of peninsular Spaniards and Spaniards born in America (criollos), the second of black and mestizo edges, and finally another formed entirely by indigenous people. Each group had its corresponding space in a kind of smaller chapels. The Chapel of la Virgen del Rosario was finished in 1732.

The Virgin and Child, whose mantles and crowns are rich in precious threads and precious stones, star in the composition of the altarpiece; the latter is described by Pazos Barrera with the following terms:

Relics of saints are preserved in the side altars of this chapel, brought from Rome at the very beginning of the foundation of Quito. With them, the rituals of the Confraternity of the Rosario de Nuestra Señora were fulfilled and the Procession of Solitude was carried out, on Good Friday, both of great devotion in the city. In the opinion of the experts, in the decoration of the Chapel of the Rosary a Baroque saturation derived from the ornamental abundance is reached.

Museum
Within the Cloister of the Santo Domingo complex, located at the north end of the main church, and on the square, a space has been designated to turn it into a museum open to the public. According to the description of Julio Pazos Barrera:

Art pieces

Both inside the Museum, as well as in the Convent and the main temple with its chapels, the Santo Domingo complex houses a large number of works of art from the Colonial Quito School of Art, especially, and other arrivals from Europe and other Hispanic colonies in America. Among them we can name the following:

See also
List of buildings in Quito

References

Roman Catholic churches in Quito
Roman Catholic churches completed in 1688
Baroque church buildings in Ecuador
1540 establishments in the Spanish Empire
Dominican churches

es:Iglesia de Santo Domingo (Quito)